Eladio Jiménez Sánchez (born 10 March 1976 in Ciudad Rodrigo, Province of Salamanca) is a retired Spanish professional road bicycle racer. On 7 December 2009 the Union Cycliste Internationale (UCI) announced that Jiménez had tested positive for erythropoietin (EPO) after winning stage 6 of the 2009 Volta a Portugal. Three days later he announced his retirement. He was suspended until 11 August 2011.

Palmarès 

 1994
 1st, Spanish National Road Championships, Junior road race
 3rd, UCI Road World Championships, Junior road race, Quito

 2000
 Vuelta a España
 1st, Stage 5, Xorret de Catí

 2001
 1st, Stage 3, GP CTT Correios de Portugal, Matosinhos

 2004
 Vuelta a España
 1st, Stage 10, Xorret de Catí

 2005
 1st, Overall, Euskal Bizikleta
 1st, Stage 2, Tolosa
 Vuelta a España
 1st, Stage 14, Lagos de Covadonga
 2nd, Mountains classification

 2006
 1st, Stage 5, Troféu Joaquim Agostinho, Torres Vedras

 2007
 3rd, Spanish National Road Championships, Elite road race, Cuenca
 2nd, Overall, Troféu Joaquim Agostinho
 1st, Stage 2, Alto Montejunto
 Volta a Portugal
 2nd, Stage 4, Santo Tirso
 1st, Stage 6, Sra. da Graça
 1st, Stage 9, Torre

 2008
 1st, Stage 3, Circuit de Lorraine, Gerardmer
 1st, Stage 2, GP CTT Correios de Portugal, Seia

 2009
 1st, Stage 6, Volta a Portugal, 6th overall (annulled after testing positive for EPO)

References

External links 

1976 births
Living people
People from Ciudad Rodrigo
Sportspeople from the Province of Salamanca
Cyclists from Castile and León
Spanish Vuelta a España stage winners
Doping cases in cycling
Spanish male cyclists